General elections were held in Monaco on 24 January 1993, with a second round of voting on 31 January. The result was a victory for the National and Democratic Union, which won 15 of the 18 seats in the National Council, the first time since 1973 that it had failed to win all 18 seats.

Results

By party

First round

Second round

References

Elections in Monaco
Monaco
1993 in Monaco
January 1993 events in Europe
Election and referendum articles with incomplete results